Walnut Grove, in the vicinity of Mer Rouge in Morehouse Parish in northern Louisiana, was listed on the National Register of Historic Places in 2007.  It has also been known as White Haven and as White House.

The house was originally built in about 1830 and was developed into more or less full form by the 1880s.  It was the home of Amelia Davenport Brown Clark (1822-1877).

See also
National Register of Historic Places listings in Morehouse Parish, Louisiana

References

Houses on the National Register of Historic Places in Louisiana
Houses completed in 1830
Morehouse Parish, Louisiana